Gregory "Greg" Moss (born September 2, 1982) is a Canadian Football League defensive back who previously played for the Winnipeg Blue Bombers.   He is now a Free Agent. In 2006 he was selected in the Renegades' dispersal draft by the Alouettes.

He is the cousin of Santana Moss, Wide Receiver for the Washington Redskins (NFL), Sinorice Moss, wide receiver for the New York Giants (NFL) and Lloyd Moss, wide receiver for Florida International University (NCAA).

High school career 
Moss attended Norland High School in Miami, Florida. While there, he starred in football, basketball, and track. As a senior, in football, he posted five interceptions, 50 tackles,  a fumble recovery and 2 touchdowns, was a Miami-Dade All-Star, and the recipient of the Coach's Award. Served as Defensive Backs coach at Nova High School in Davie, Fl.

Coaching career
from 2008-2011. Has Held the Defensive Quality Control (Secondary) position at Florida International University (FIU) from 2012 to 2014, and now is the Cornerback Coach at FIU. 
Starting in the fall of 2019 Greg Moss was hired at Charleston Southern University as the Secondary Coach.

References

1982 births
Living people
Canadian football defensive backs
Ottawa Renegades players
Montreal Alouettes players
Winnipeg Blue Bombers players
American players of Canadian football